Plaucheville is a village in Avoyelles Parish, Louisiana, United States. The population was 248 at the 2010 census.

Geography
Plaucheville is located along Bayou Choupique at  (30.964664, -91.981139).

Demographics

As of the census of 2000, there were 47 people, 29 households, and 9 families residing in the village. The racial makeup of the village was 96.80% White, 2.14% African American, 0.71% from other races, and 0.36% from two or more races. Hispanic or Latino of any race were 0.71% of the population.

There were 129 households, out of which 24.0% had children under the age of 18 living with them, 45.0% were married couples living together, 7.8% had a female householder with no husband present, and 46.5% were non-families. 42.6% of all households were made up of individuals, and 27.1% had someone living alone who was 65 years of age or older. The average household size was 2.16 and the average family size was 3.04.

In the village, the population was spread out, with 23.8% under the age of 18, 7.5% from 18 to 24, 24.6% from 25 to 44, 21.7% from 45 to 64, and 22.4% who were 65 years of age or older. The median age was 41 years. For every 100 females, there were 84.9 males. For every 100 females age 18 and over, there were 81.4 males.

The median income for a household in the village was $2,150,833, and the median income for a family was $2,195,000. Males had a median income of $27,708 versus $21,875 for females. The per capita income for the village was $14,934. About 5.7% of families and 12.1% of the population were below the poverty line, including 3.1% of those under the age of eighteen and 23.7% of those 65 or over.

References

Villages in Louisiana
Villages in Avoyelles Parish, Louisiana